Eva Grant (born 25 March 1925) is a Turkish-born Greek-British a glamour photographer who worked in the male-dominated glamour industry of the 1950s and early 1960s. She worked and lived in Britain and became known for her nude studies and her pocket magazine Line and Form, which ran for over forty issues.

Early life
Grant was born in Istanbul, Turkey, to Greek parents in 1925. The family returned to Greece in 1930 and settled in Athens, where she spent the Second World War and her formative and teenage years.

Life in London
Aged 22, Grant moved to London and began work as a student nurse at Shenley Hospital, a psychiatric institution in Hertfordshire. She supplemented her income by doing the occasional assignment as a swimwear model. She found modelling boring and was more interested in what was going on behind the camera. With her first husband, Cyril Grant, she rented out a basement flat with a darkroom attached as a studio to amateur photographers. Soon she was taking her own photographs and getting commissions from British and French magazines, such as Paris Hollywood.

Career
Grant often worked with professional nude models such as Lorraine Burnett, June Palmer, and Lee Sothern (aka Grace Jackson). In 1956 she went to New York; the Evening Standard ran the story: "Photographer Eva Grant goes to New York armed with hundreds of pictures of beautiful girls to take America by storm." Her work thereafter appeared regularly in American photography magazines, such as those published by Fawcett and Whitestone: Glamour Photos, Camera Studies of Figure Beauty and Salon Photography. As her career progressed, she began giving talks and lectures on figure photography. Her outdoor nudes frequently appeared in the naturist magazine Health & Efficiency. The 1964 spring issue of Figure Annual called her "the world's foremost female figure photographer" while the British photography press described her as "one of the most expert and experienced woman glamour photographers in the business".
 
By the mid-1960s, the heyday of figure studies and innocent glamour work was coming to an end. In 1964 Grant gave up photography and sold her studio; shortly afterward, she had her fourth child.

During the 1970s, Grant became a tour guide for the London Tourist Board, and continued this into the 1980s.

Later life
Grant separated from her first husband and married Lord Hatch of Lusby, a prominent anti-apartheid campaigner, who died in 1992.

As of January 2022, Grant lives in Kew, London.

References

 

1925 births
Living people
20th-century British photographers
Artists from Athens
British erotic photographers
English women photographers
Greek expatriates in the United Kingdom
Greek photographers
Greek women photographers
Nude photography
Photographers from Istanbul
20th-century women photographers